Carl Webb (born 20 March 1981) is an Australian former professional rugby league footballer who played as a  and  in the 2000s and 2010s.

He played for the Brisbane Broncos, North Queensland Cowboys and the Parramatta Eels in the NRL. Webb played for Queensland in the State of Origin series, Australia at international level and also the Indigenous All Stars side.

Background
Webb was born in Mount Isa, Queensland, Australia and is of Indigenous Australian and New Zealand descent.
Webb Played for the Dalby Diehards in the Toowoomba Rugby League Competition during the Mid 1990's. As a teenager at 15 and 16 years of age, he would play in the Dalby first grade side.

Webb played for the Toowoomba Clydesdales before joining the Brisbane Broncos.

Professional playing career

Brisbane
After made his NRL debut for the Brisbane Broncos in 2000 against the North Queensland Cowboys. The next year he made his debut in State of Origin, representing Queensland, scoring one try. He won the 2001 Brisbane Broncos season's Rookie of the Year award but a combination of inconsistent form and injuries saw him in and out of first grade until he was contracted to the North Queensland Cowboys for the 2005 season

North Queensland
Webb had a strong start to the 2005 NRL season, earning a position in the Queensland Maroons. Injury impeded his season and he was later suspended for punching, forcing him to watch the 2005 NRL Grand final loss to the Tigers from the sidelines. Webb was selected at second-row forward for Game II of the 2006 State of Origin series, scoring a try. In 2007, Webb again started the season strongly, but suffered a broken jaw early in the season. He returned to the field in round 8. 

In May 2008 Webb played in his debut test for the Australian national team against New Zealand.  On 20 May 2008 Webb re-signed with the Cowboys until the end of the 2010 season, a contract rumoured to be worth around A$300,000 a year. He was named in the Australia training squad for the 2008 Rugby League World Cup, but was not selected to play. He played for the Prime Minister's XIII against Papua New Guinea in the post season and also appeared at the World Cup's opening night for the Indigenous Australian team in a match against the New Zealand Maori team.

Webb was selected to play at prop forward in the 2010 All Stars match for the Indigenous all Stars team. On 31 August 2010, Webb signed with the Parramatta Eels to play there for the 2011 and 2012 seasons, along with fellow NRL veterans Chris Walker, Chris Hicks, Casey McGuire and Paul Whatuira.

Parramatta
For the 2011 All Stars match Webb was selected for the interchange bench of the Indigenous All Stars team.
On 9 August 2011 Webb announced his immediate retirement from the NRL, only after playing 6 games for the Eels.

Personal life

Arrest
In 2015, Webb was arrested and charged with three counts of attempting to enter a dwelling with intent at night, threatening violence and one count of wilful damage after a late-night street rampage in Trinity Park, a suburb of Cairns. On 14 September 2015, Webb was sentenced to 18 months' probation, including an order for counselling. He was also ordered to pay a total of $2,417 for repair of damages to the homes and car. No conviction was recorded.

Boxing
Webb, who had been boxing for years, made his professional debut in January 2010 against heavyweight Scott Lewis on the Anthony Mundine versus Robert Medley undercard in Sydney. He lost the bout.

Illness
On 5 March 2020, it was revealed that Webb had been diagnosed with early-onset motor neurone disease.

References

External links
North Queensland Cowboys profile

http://www.heraldsun.com.au/sport/nrl/parramatta-eels-sign-north-queensland-cowboys-prop-carl-webb/story-e6frfgbo-1225912539943
http://www.abc.net.au/news/2015-09-14/carl-webb-gets-18-months-probation-for-drunken-rampage/6773242 15 September 2015. Retrieved 24 September 2016.

1981 births
Living people
Australian Aboriginal rugby league team players
Australian rugby league players
Indigenous Australian rugby league players
Australian people of Māori descent
Australia national rugby league team players
Brisbane Broncos players
North Queensland Cowboys players
Parramatta Eels players
Queensland Rugby League State of Origin players
Indigenous All Stars players
People from the Darling Downs
People with motor neuron disease
Prime Minister's XIII players
Rugby league props
Rugby league second-rows
Rugby league players from Mount Isa
Toowoomba Clydesdales players
Wentworthville Magpies players